Florián Johannes Trittel Paul (born 23 May 1994) is a Spanish sailor. He competed in the Nacra 17 event at the 2020 Summer Olympics.

Notes

References

External links
 
 

1994 births
Living people
Spanish male sailors (sport)
Olympic sailors of Spain
Sailors at the 2020 Summer Olympics – Nacra 17
Place of birth missing (living people)